Una Watters (4 November 1918 – 20 November 1965) was an Irish artist and librarian. She was the artist behind the Claíomh Solais (Sword of Light) image used to commemorate the 50th anniversary of the Easter Rising in 1966.

Life
Una Watters was born Una McDonnell in Dublin on 4 November 1918. She attended the Holy Faith Convent in Glasnevin and then the  National College of Art and Design, where she was mentored by artist Maurice MacGonigal. During this time she also worked as a librarian. She was married to the poet and writer Eoghan Ó Tuairisc on 10 March 1945.

Watters exhibited with the Royal Hibernian Academy between 1956 and 1965, alongside fellow artists William Leech, Louis le Brocquy, Harry Kernoff, Muriel Brandt, and her cousin Sean O’Sullivan. She was a member of the Society of Dublin Painters. Her work Annunciation was exhibited at the 1949 Irish Exhibition of Living Art. Her early works focus on religious subjects, with later subjects focusing on the everyday. She painted in the kitchen of the cottage she lived in with her husband at Cappagh Cross, Finglas. She primarily worked in oils, with her later works becoming more abstract showing modernist influences. As well as painting she was a draughtswoman and calligrapher, designing greetings cards and illustrating annuals and journals. In the 1960s she illustrated a series of booklets of religious meditations by her uncle Brian O'Higgins.

Watters won an Arts Council Award in 1965 for which she produced her best known work the Claíomh Solais. The image became the emblem of the 50th anniversary commemoration of the Easter Rising. The image was used on badges, brooches, tie pins as well as being featured on all of the official publications, featured on a first day stamp and stickers to commemorate the events. Watters died before she received the Award, dying suddenly on 20 November 1965.

Her husband organised a posthumous exhibition of 37 of her oil paintings. The Hugh Lane Gallery hold her painting The People’s Garden, and the library in which she worked, Phibsboro, still displays her painting The Four Masters. Navan library also holds a painting which she painted of her Uncle, Brian O'Higgins.

References

1918 births
1965 deaths
Artists from Dublin (city)
20th-century Irish painters
20th-century Irish women artists
Alumni of the National College of Art and Design
Irish women painters